Melitidin is a flavanone glycoside. Melitidin was discovered in bergamot orange juice and exhibits statin-like properties so the juice seems to have hypolipidemic activity.

See also
Brutieridin

References

Bibliography

External links

Flavanone glycosides
Flavonoid rutinosides
Flavonoids found in Rutaceae